Anna Frithioff (born 4 December 1962) is a Swedish cross-country skier who competed from 1992 to 1999. She won a bronze medal in the 4 × 5 km relay at the 1995 FIS Nordic World Ski Championships in Thunder Bay, and had her best individual finish of ninth in the 5 km event at those same championships.

Frithioff's best individual finish at the Winter Olympics was 13th in the 30 km event at Lillehammer in 1994. She also had two victories at FIS races in Sweden at 5 km (1995, 1998).

In 1991 and 1992, she won Tjejvasan.

Cross-country skiing results
All results are sourced from the International Ski Federation (FIS).

Olympic Games

World Championships
 1 medal – (1 bronze)

World Cup

Season standings

Team podiums

 3 podiums 

Note:   Until the 1999 World Championships, World Championship races were included in the World Cup scoring system.

References

External links

1962 births
Living people
Swedish female cross-country skiers
Cross-country skiers at the 1994 Winter Olympics
Olympic cross-country skiers of Sweden
FIS Nordic World Ski Championships medalists in cross-country skiing
Swedish female biathletes
People from Jönköping Municipality
Sportspeople from Jönköping County